Angola is a country in Southern Africa.

Angola may also refer to:

Places

United States
 Angola, Delaware, a city in the state of Delaware
 Angola, Florida, a settlement founded by escaped slaves from 1812 until 1821 near Bradenton, Florida
 Angola, Indiana, a city in the state of Indiana
 Angola, Kansas, a city in the state of Kansas
 Angola, Michigan, a ghost town
 Angola, New York, a village in the state of New York near Buffalo
Angola Horror, an 1867 train wreck that occurred there
 Louisiana State Penitentiary (also known as "Angola"), a state penitentiary in West Feliciana Parish, Louisiana

Other places
 Kingdom of Ndongo, a historical Bantu kingdom
 Portuguese Angola, a historic Portuguese colonial territory

Other uses
 Angola (shawl), an imitated cashmere shawl
 Capoeira Angola, a style of the Afro-Brazilian martial art Capoeira
 Angola (Book of Mormon), a city in the Book of Mormon
 "Angola, Louisiana," a song from the 1978 album Secrets by Gil Scott-Heron and Brian Jackson
Braian Angola (born 1994), Colombian basketball player

See also
 Angolan (disambiguation)